The Falling Kind is the second full-length studio album by Semi-Gloss. Released in 2000 on Dirt Records, it is the last album to be released by the band.

Track listing
All songs written by Jordy Mokriski except where noted.
"Stephanie's Boy" – 3:05
"First We Kissed" – 4:27
"Caroline" – 4:30
"The Falling Kind" – 4:47
"Ieri E Oggi" (Mokriski, Wiesendanger) – 3:12
"Passerby" – 3:19
"Playground" – 2:58
"Tiny" – 3:58
"Baby's Changed" – 4:15
"Careless" (Graf, Mokriski, Wiesendanger) – 5:17
"Brand New Day" – 5:10

Personnel
Jordy Mokriski - guitar, vocals
Verena Wiesendanger - lead vocals
Gregory Graf - bass
Lem Jay Ignacio - keyboards
Joey Waronker - drums
Danny Frankel - percussion

2000 albums
Semi-Gloss albums
Dirt Records albums